Kan Creek, is a stream of water flowing through Western Tehran.

Route
Kan Creek's primary source is from the west of Tochal. The creek navigates downstream to Kan village and Metropolitan Tehran passing by Eram Park and Azadi Sport Complex until reaching the southern outskirts of Tehran where the stream dries. Parts of Hemmat Expressway, Freeway 2 (Iran), Freeway 5 (Iran) and Mehrabad Airport are built over the creek's course.

Revitalization
The creek's bed and banks are also planned to be encased by heavy stones and concrete. Tehran's district 22 municipality has considered Kan Creek a primary source of water for the currently under construction Chitgar Lake, the stream will provide 80 percent of the artificial lake's inflow.

Crossings
  Hemmat Expressway
  Hakim Expressway
  Freeway 2 (Iran)
  Road 32 (Iran)
  Fath Expressway
  Freeway 5 (Iran)
  Saidi Expressway 
  Road 65 (Iran)
  Freeway 7 (Iran)
  Road 71 (Iran)

References

External links
 Tehran District 22's website

Rivers of Iran
Geography of Tehran
Landforms of Tehran Province
Rivers of Tehran Province